Methera is an English string quartet which plays traditional music and compositions by the members of the group. They have collaborated with other folk musicians including Karen Tweed, Nancy Kerr and James Fagan.

They recorded for the BBC Radio 3 feature England in Ribbons, and played on the soundtrack of the film Morris: A Life with Bells On. The quartet's eponymous debut album was released in 2008, and they released a live album entitled Methera In Concert in 2010.

Group members
John Dipper plays fiddle. He plays with other bands, most notably English Acoustic Collective with Chris Wood and Robert Harbron.
Emma Reid plays fiddle. She has worked with a range of musicians including Sofia Karlsson, May Monday (Karen Tweed and Timo Alakotila), Ditt Ditt Darium, and the Under One Sky project with John McCusker.
Miranda Rutter plays viola. She has previously played with Jabadaw and Fika.
Lucy Deakin plays cello. She has also appeared on recordings by alternative post-rock band iLiKETRAiNS.

Recordings 
 2008Methera YAN001
 2010Methera in Concert, featuring the trio Kerr Fagan Harbron TAN002

References

External links
 . Official website.
Methera myspace page
 

English string quartets